The Titular Bishop of Jegra is a titular bishop of the Serbian Orthodox Church, who also serves as the vicar bishop for the Bishop of Bačka. The see of bishop  is Kovilj Monastery in Kovilj near Novi Sad. The Eparchy of Bačka is an ecclesiastical territory in the Bačka region, Serbia.

Created in 1999, the titular bishop bears the title of the old Eparchy of Jegra (named after the Hungarian city Eger), which was the northernmost eparchy during the time of the Serbian Patriarchate of Peć. The eparchy was abolished in 1713, and its territory was annexed to the Eparchy of Bačka, whose bishop bore the title "Bačka, Szeged and Jegar".

The titular bishop is a member of the Bishops' Council of the Serbian Orthodox Church.

List of bishops

See also 
 List of eparchies of the Serbian Orthodox Church

References

Bishops of the Serbian Orthodox Church